Sarah Stolfa (born 1975) is an American contemporary artist, photographer, and musician.

Biography
Stolfa attended Drexel University's photography program and graduated from Yale University's MFA program in 2009. Stolfa's most recognizable series, 'The Regulars', won her The New York Times Photography Contest for College Students in 2004. 
As a bartender at Philadelphia’s McGlinchey’s Tavern, Stolfa began to photograph her regulars opposite the bar. Her carefully composed, large-scale color prints express the intimacy and sincerity in worker and patron relationships. Furthermore, Stolfa’s images confront a social commentary on the urban bar experience with the isolated subjects and their props, namely, ashtrays, mugs, and money. Stolfa creates powerful portraits of the diverse group of regulars in a way that is reminiscent of Seventeenth Century Dutch paintings in their color, lighting, and decipherable detail.

Stolfa had a solo show at the Pearlstein Gallery at Drexel University in 2004.

Stolfa is the Executive Director of the Philadelphia Photo Arts Center, a non-profit organization which opened in the late summer of 2009.

Stolfa also played Farfisa organ in the Delta 72 in the late 90s.

Exhibitions

2005: Photography 24, Perkins Center for the Arts, Moorestown, NJ
2005: Noteworthy, Perkins Center for the Arts, Moorestown, NJ
2005: Arcadia Solo Exhibition, Old Greenwich, CT (solo)
2006: Second Woodmere Triennial of Contemporary Photography, Woodmere Art Museum, Philadelphia, PA
2007: Women to Watch: Photography in Philadelphia, The Galleries at Moore College of Art and Design, Philadelphia, PA
2008: Yale MFA Photography 2008, Green Gallery, Yale University, New Haven, CT

Publications 
 2009	The Regulars, Monograph, Artisan books

References

General references
 2006  "Photo Finish," The Philadelphia Weekly, June 9–15
 2004	"A Student, Sarah Stolfa, Hits the Big Time," Drexel, The Alumni Magazine of Drexel University
 2006	"Tale of the Triennial," Art Matters, April
 2006  "With a Broad Brush," Philadelphia Weekly, Fall Guide, Sept 13–19
 2006	"Last Call," Philadelphia City Paper, Sept 21–28
 2006	"Bar Examinations," Philadelphia Style Magazine, Fall
 2006	"Philadelphia: Fall Exhibitions Short List," Art Review, Fall
 2007 The New Yorker, Jan 8
 2007	The New York Times Magazine, April 29

External links 
 Philadelphia Photo Arts Center (PPAC)
 Sarah Stolfa at Gallery 339
 theexposureproject.blogspot.com
 Photographer Sarah Stolfa moves out and says goodbye to The Regulars. By John Vettese. September 21, 2006 
 Ryan Weideman and Sarah Stolfa: Silverstein Photography ArtForum. February 2007. By Lisa Turvey
 Bruce Silverstein Gallery
 Interview with Sarah Stolfa

Drexel University alumni
Yale University alumni
American photographers
Living people
1975 births
American women photographers
21st-century American women